The Esan people (Esan:   are an ethnic group of southern Nigeria who speak the Esan language. The Esan are traditionally known to be agriculturalists, trado-medical practitioners, mercenary warriors and hunters. They cultivate palm trees, Irvingia gabonensis (erhonhiele), Cherry (Otien), bell pepper (akoh) coconut, betel nut, kola nut, black pear, avocado pear, yams, cocoyam, cassava, maize, rice, beans, groundnut, bananas, oranges, plantains, sugar cane, tomato, potato, okra, pineapple, paw paw,  and various vegetables.

The modern Esan nation is believed to have been organized during the 15th century, when citizens, mostly nobles and princess, left the neighbouring Benin Empire for the northeast; there they formed communities and kingdoms called  among the aboriginal peoples whom they met there There are on the whole 35 established kingdoms in Esanland, including Amahor, Ebelle, Egoro, Ewohimi, Ekekhenlen, Ekpoma, Ekpon, Emu, Ewu, Ewato, Ewosa, Idoa, Ifeku, Igueben, Ilushi, Inyelen, Irrua, Ogwa, Ohordua, Okalo, Okhuesan, Onogholo, Opoji, Oria, Orowa, Uromi, Udo, Ugbegun, Ugboha, Ubiaja, Urhohi, Ugun, Ujiogba, Ukhun, and Uzea.

The Esan Kingdoms often warred among each other. Despite the war, the Esans kept a homogenous culture that was chiefly influenced by the Benin Empire. However, these kingdoms were colonized, along with the Benin Empire,  by the British Empire during September 1897, only gaining independence 63 years later in 1960 when Nigeria became independent from British Colonial rule. After independence, the Esan people have suffered from civil war, poverty, and lack of infrastructure.

The Esans primarily speak the Esan language, an Edoid language related to Edo, Urhobo, Owan language, Isoko, Anioma and Etsako. It is considered a regionally important language in Nigeria, and it is taught in primary schools in addition to being broadcast on radio and television. The Esan language is also recognized in the Census of the United Kingdom.

It is estimated that the Esan people who reside in Esanland number about one million to 1.5 million citizens  Nigeria,  and there is a strong Esan diaspora.

Etymology and identity
The term Esan has been applied to the Esan people for hundreds of years, and was used before contact with Europeans. It is believed by many historians that the name 'Esan' (originally, 'E san fia') owes its origin to Benin (meaning, 'they have fled' or 'they jumped away'). 'Ishan' is an Anglicized form of 'Esan', the result of colonial Britain's inability to properly pronounce the name of this ethnic group. It is believed that similar corruption has affected such Esan names as ubhẹkhẹ (now 'obeche' tree), uloko (now 'iroko' tree), Abhulimẹn (now 'Aburime'), etc. Efforts have however been made to return to status quo ante.

For academic purposes, Esan refers to
 the ethnic group that occupies central Edo State;
 (plural unchanged) a person or the people collectively from this ethnic group;
 the language of these people which, linguistically, is of the Kwa subdivision of the Niger-Congo language family;
  something of, related to, or having Esan origin e.g. uro Esan (=Esan language), otọ Esan (=Esan land), ọghẹdẹ Esan (=Esan banana).
In the pre-colonial era, Esans carried a crow's foot tribal scar below their eyes.

History

Pre-historical/classical period
According to archaeological and linguistic evidence, humans have resided in the savannah-forest ecotone in Esanland for at least 3000 years ago.

Starting from 500 AD to 750 AD, these hunter-gatherers started to colonize the savannah-forest ecosystem of Esanland and the forest ecosystem of the Benin Empire. They created a pre-Esan, pre-Edo society that built advanced structures such as moats and walls around family properties. These enclosures were, at maximum, three to five kilometers in diameter, and demarcated residential and agricultural property. Those properties enlarged to become villages, and by 800 AD, these village coalesced to form kingdoms with hierarchies. Modern-day digs in the region have found that these walls were situated in the eastern Benin Empire and northern Esanland. Settlements were close to permanent springs on the northern plateau, but never next to intermittent springs.

 Esanland's culture, language and growth were majorly influenced by the mass exoduses to Esan territory from all adjacent polities Communities on Esanland's southern and eastern fringes (Ewohimi, Ewatto, Ekpon, Amahor) were heavily populated by Igbos and Igalas (into Uroh); from the north came the Emai into Ukhun, Idoa, and Amahor and the Etsako into Irrua); and from the south came the Itsekiri (into Ekpon) and Urhobo (into Ujiogba).

 The biggest influence on Esanland came from Edo, founders of Benin Empire. In 1460, Oba Ewuare passed laws of mourning that prohibited sexual intercourse, bathing, drumming, dancing, and cooking. These laws proved too restrictive for many citizens, and these citizens fled the kingdom to Esanland. This exodus shaped Esanland's modern cultural identity and gave rise to the term "Esan," or "refugee." Oral tradition has heavily supported this theory. Prominent Esan and Edo historians have collected stories about this migration.

Pre-colonization 
Esan kingdoms had a varying degree of autonomy, but were ultimately controlled by the Benin Empire. Yet, several wars between Esan kingdoms and Benin were recorded. This was due to the Oba, at ascension on the throne, sending white chalk to the Esans as a term of friendship. If the chalk was rejected, then the Oba would try to invade Esanland. The varying political stabilities of Benin and the Esan kingdoms also led to warfare. Such warfare was so common that there is no recorded history of peace between all of the Esan kingdoms and Benin.

Esanland was extensively involved in world trade. Benin's sovereignty over Esanland enabled it to send long-distant traders, or  Ekhen procured cloth, ivory, peppers, and slaves for European merchants in Yorubaland, Esanland, and Afenmai. .

 During the 16th century, the Uzea War occurred. This war was between the Uromi Kingdom and the Benin Kingdom. The war lasted from 1502 to 1503, and resulted from a refusal of friendship from Oba Ozolua of Benin by Onojie Agba of Uromi. The war ended at the town of Uzea, when both leaders were killed. However, in peaceful times Esan kingdoms would loan soldiers to the Benin Kingdom, such as during the Idah War of 1515–1516, and the sacking of Akure in 1823.

 During the nineteenth century, northern Esanland was continually attacked and sacked by the Muslim Nupe people in the hunt for slaves and converts to Islam, having previously taken over the Kukuruku peoples' lands. Many Esan kingdoms from the south helped in the battle to fend off the Nupes. The battles came into the Esans' favor; several Nupe and Etsako warriors were brought into Esan cities where their posterity reside today. The nineteenth century brought increasing influence of Europe on Esanland, as the English demanded palm-products.

Esan warfare and colonization 

 In 1897, the British launched the Benin Expedition of 1897, which left the Esan independent from the Kingdom of Benin. In 1899, the British led an invasion into the Esan kingdoms that lasted for seven years. Esanland proved to be harder to conquer than the Benin Kingdom because of its strong autonomy: Kingdoms chose to keep fighting the British even if its neighbors capitulated. Defeated Benin chiefs like Ologbosere and Ebohon were still resistant to British rule inadvertently guarded Esan soil from the west, by establishing military outposts and blocking roads. This lasted from 1897 to 22 April 1899, where Ologbosere surrendered at the border village of Okemue.

The first kingdom to be attacked by the British was the Kingdom of Ekpon. Ekpon launched a fierce resistance against the British invasion on 22 April, leading to months of skirmishes. After the initial British invasion into the Kingdom of Expon became bogged down, the kingdom of Ekpon led an ambush of the British camp at Okueme, on 29 April. This led British forces to retreat, consolidate their power, and defeat and kill Ologbosere in May. Subsequent attempts by the British failed as well: conquests into Irrua, for example, led to an adoption of a guerrilla warfare strategy followed by a retreat; this method was so successful that other Esan kingdoms adopted it and the British did not invade Esanland until 1901.

On 16 March 1901, the Kingdom of Uromi, headed by the old, yet intelligent Onojie Okolo, was attacked by the British. The Uromi response, led by Prince Okojie, was swift and employed guerrilla warfare. After a short time, British forces captured the village of Amedokhian, where Okolo was stationed, and killed him. This angered Prince Okojie so much that he killed the Captain of the British troops before reinforcements were brought in. The British then realized that Uromi was nigh impenetrable without native help, and contact local sympathizers such as Onokpogua, the Ezomo of Uromi. This succeeded in kidnapping Prince Okojie out of the forest and sending him to the British offices at Calabar.

This process was duplicated in most of the kingdoms that fought with Britain; guerilla warfare was excessively used by the Esans, resulting in prolonged battle time in spite of inferior weapons, and reinforcements from Benin City for the British. Even when villages were captured, internal resistance was fierce; continued guerilla warfare in Uromi forced the British to release Prince Okojie. The British responded by razing several villages they had captured. Finally, in 1906, Esanland submitted to British rule, and the thirty-four kingdoms became the Ishan Division in the British colony of Nigeria.

Performing arts/music
Esan dance is dominated by the Igbabonelimhin, an acrobatic dance performed mostly by young males. Igbabonelimhin involves spinning and somersaulting to a timed beat. The mode of operation varies amongst Esan villages. This slight clash can be seen on fixed days for performances. Under normal circumstances, Igbabonelimhin is performed every two weeks of the Esan calendar and on the market days of the various villages and towns that make up Esan. Igbabonelimhin could be danced annually to mark end of year celebrations, new yam festivals and organised social functions, like burial ceremonies. Today, the dance is taken as a unique symbol for Esans everywhere.

Notable Esans in Nigeria
 Anthony Enahoro, journalist, politician, former Federal Commissioner, former Chairman NADECO, raised the motion for the independence of Nigeria in 1953 at the age of 30
 Augustus Aikhomu, Navy Admiral and former military Vice President of Nigeria
 Ambrose Folorunsho Alli, professor of medicine, Governor of Bendel State and the founder of Bendel State University, later posthumously renamed Ambrose Alli University
 Anthony Anenih, police officer, politician, former Chairman Social Democratic Party, former PDP Board of Trustees Chairman, and former Minister of Works and Housing
 Tom Ikimi, architect, politician, former chairman, National Republican Convention and former Minister of Foreign Affairs
 Festus Iyayi, writer
 Stella Obasanjo, the First Lady of Nigeria from 1999 until her death
 Anthony Olubunmi Okogie, Cardinal and former Archbishop of Lagos
 Sonny Okosun, musician
 Chris Oyakhilome, evangelist and president of Christ Embassy
 Fidelis Oyakhilome, former Lagos State Police Commissioner and former Governor of Rivers State
 Amb. (Dr.) Martin Ihoeghian Uhomoibhi, former President of the United Nations Human Rights Council
 Victor Ehikhamenor, artist, writer, and photographer.
 Peter Enahoro, journalist, writer, columnist, and author of the book, How to Be a Nigerian.
Julius Okojie, former executive secretary, National Universities Commission

Religion and folklore 
Esan folktales and folklore, like the igbabonẹlimhin and akhuẹ, serve as forms of learning and entertainment. The Esan have prominent traditional rulers who keep order in a society where beauty and manners are intertwined. Despite the long-term impact of Christianity, the Esan are largely traditional and a large number practice traditional beliefs in the form of worship of ancestral spirits and other gods. A large percentage of Esan are Christians, mostly Catholic and recently of other denominations. Esan has various dialects all of which stem from Bini and there is still close affinity between the Esan and the Benin people, which led to the common saying "Esan ii gbi Ẹdo" meaning, Esan does not harm the Ẹdo (i.e. Bini). There have been other translation of that saying, Esan gbe Edo which means Esan have conquered Bini.<ref></ref>

Traditional Esan religion has many similarities to traditional Edo religion, due to the Esan migration to the northeast during the 15th century from the Benin Empire. There are many deities of the Esan religion:
 Osanobua, the main Edo-Esan god. This name for God was brought over to Christianity and its missionaries, and thus the translation for God in Esanland is Osanobua.
 Olokun
 Esu, the Esan trickster god. This god is shared with Yoruba and Edo myth. The name Esu was used as a translation for Satan by Christian missionaries.
 Osun, the Esan god of medicine. This is where the surname Okosun, or son of medicine, originated from.

Esan Local Government Areas in Edo State 
The autonomous clans/kingdoms in Esan land are currently administratively arranged as follows under the current five local government areas:
 Esan-North-East LGA, Uromi: Uromi and Uzea
 Esan Central LGA, Irrua: Irrua, Ugbegun, Opoji, Ewu, Ebudin
 Esan West LGA, Ekpoma: Ekpoma, Iruekpen, Idoa, Ogwa, Urohi, Ukhun, Egoro and Ujiogba
 Esan South East LGA, Ubiaja:, Ubiaja, Ewohimi, Emu, Ohordua, Ẹwatto, Okhuesan, Orowa, Ugboha, Oria, Illushi, Onogholo, Inyenlen
 Igueben LGA, Igueben: Igueben, Ebelle, Amaho, Ẹwossa, Udo, Ekpon, Ugun, Okalo,

See also
 Esan language
 Ibore, an ancient city

References

Further reading

General
 
 
 
 
 http://ufdc.ufl.edu/UF00075002/00001/1j
Mythology
 
Art

External links
 Gerontocracy of Esan people
 
 

 
Ethnic groups in Nigeria
Edo State